The Arghons are a small community of descendants of immigrants from Yarkand and Kashmir that have intermingled with the local Ladakhi community, residing mainly in Leh and Kargil towns of Ladakh, India. They are Sunni Muslims. 

They first arrived as traders and merchants from Central Asia and Kashmir in the 17th century and were among the first Muslims to settle in the Buddhist Kingdom. Most were traders but some included religious people. Most central Asian merchants returned home at the end of the caravan season. Those who remained and settled in Ladakh married ladakhis and are now known as Arghons. 

Today they are merchants although some, a very few, have taken to agriculture. Most of them today speak the Ladakhi language but are also conversant in Turkic and Tibetan.

See also
 Tibetan Muslims
 Central Asia
 Uyghurs

References

External links
 

Social groups of Pakistan
Nomadic groups in Eurasia
Central Asian people
Social groups of Jammu and Kashmir
Muslim communities of India